Gavin Muir (September 8, 1900 – May 24, 1972) was an American film, television, and theatre actor.

Biography

Muir's mother was American, and his father was Scottish. Although he was born in Chicago, he was educated in England at the University College School. 

Muir's career included acting on Broadway through 1933. His first film appearance was in 1932 in a short film, then in John Ford's Mary of Scotland in 1936.  His film career continued through 1965, often in character roles, and with a sort of specialty in villains with British accents.

Broadway roles
 Enter Madame (1920) as John Fitzgerald 
 Hay Fever (1927) with Laura Hope Crews and Frieda Inescort

Partial filmography 

 Half Angel (1936) - Dr. William Barth
 Mary of Scotland (1936) - Leicester
 Charlie Chan at the Race Track (1936) - Bagley
 Lloyd's of London (1936) - Sir Gavin Gore
 The Holy Terror (1937) - Redman
 Fair Warning (1937) - Herbert Willett
 Wee Willie Winkie (1937) - Capt. Bibberbeigh
 Tarzan Finds a Son! (1939) - Pilot (uncredited)
 One Night in Lisbon (1941) - Aide (uncredited)
 A Yank in the R.A.F. (1941) - Wing Commander (uncredited)
 Dangerously They Live (1941) - Capt. Strong (credits) / Captain Hunter
 Captains of the Clouds (1942) - Orderly (uncredited)
 Eagle Squadron (1942) - Maj. Severn
 Sherlock Holmes and the Voice of Terror (1942) - BBC Radio Announcer (voice, uncredited)
 Nightmare (1942) - J.B. Abbington
 Hitler's Children (1943) - Nazi Major
 Sherlock Holmes in Washington (1943) - Bart Lang
 Passport to Suez (1943) - Karl
 Sherlock Holmes Faces Death (1943) - Phillip Musgrave
 Passport to Destiny (1944) - Herr Joyce / Lord Haw-Haw
 The Story of Dr. Wassell (1944) - Dutch Military Messenger (uncredited)
 The White Cliffs of Dover (1944) - Captain Griffiths (uncredited)
 The Merry Monahans (1944) - Weldon Laydon, Broadway Talent Scout
 The Master Race (1944) - Captain William Forsythe
 Tonight and Every Night (1945) - Group Captain G. Homesby (uncredited)
 Sherlock Holmes and the House of Fear (1945) - Chalmers
 Patrick the Great (1945) - Prentis Johns
 Salome Where She Danced (1945) - Henderson
 The Brighton Strangler (1945) - Capt. Perry (uncredited)
 O.S.S. (1946) - Col. Crawson
 Temptation (1946) - Smith-Parrington (uncredited)
 California (1947) - Booth Pennock
 Calcutta (1947) - Inspector Kendricks
 The Imperfect Lady (1947) - Kelvin (uncredited)
 Ivy (1947) - Sergeant (uncredited)
 Unconquered (1947) - Lieut. Fergus McKenzie
 The Prince of Thieves (1948) - Baron Tristram (uncredited)
 Chicago Deadline (1949) - G.G. Temple
 Rogues of Sherwood Forest (1950) - Baron Alfred (uncredited)
 Abbott and Costello Meet the Invisible Man (1951) - Dr. Philip Gray
 Double Crossbones (1951) - British Sea Captain (uncredited)
 Thunder on the Hill (1951) - Melling
 The Son of Dr. Jekyll (1951) - Editor Richard Daniels
 Lady in the Iron Mask (1952)
 The Desert Rats (1953) - Captain (uncredited)
 The Royal African Rifles (1953)
 King of the Khyber Rifles (1953) - Maj. Lee, doctor (uncredited)
 Charge of the Lancers (1954) - Ring Official at Boxing Match (uncredited)
 King Richard and the Crusaders (1954) - Physician (uncredited)
 Khyber Patrol (1954) - (uncredited)
 Escape to Burma (1955) - Astrologer
 The Sea Chase (1955) - British Officer of the Watch (uncredited)
 D-Day the Sixth of June (1956) - Voice of Radio Broadcaster (uncredited)
 The Abductors (1957) - Herbert Evans
 Johnny Trouble (1957) - Madden
 Too Much, Too Soon (1958) - Sean (uncredited)
 Island of Lost Women (1959) - Dr. McBain
 The Miracle (1959) - Colonel (uncredited)
 Night Tide (1961) - Capt. Samuel Murdock

References

External links 
 
 

1900 births
1972 deaths
Male actors from Chicago
American male stage actors
American male film actors
American male television actors
20th-century American male actors
American expatriates in the United Kingdom